Albert Pagara (born February 18, 1994) is a Filipino professional boxer. He currently competes in the super bantamweight division and was a WBO and IBF Inter-Continental champion.

Professional boxer Jason Pagara is his older brother.

Early life
Albert Pagara was born in Barangay Lib-og, Maasin, Southern Leyte to Reynaldo Pagara and Sabrian Herugalem.  His older brother, Jason, is also a professional boxer.

Pagara started amateur boxing under the Maasin Sports Council. Along with his brother, he moved to Cagayan de Oro to train further. There, the brothers studied at Misamis Oriental General Comprehensive High School. During his teens, he won a total of 10 gold medals in Palarong Pambansa.

Professional boxing career
Pagara made his professional debut on August 18, 2011, at the age of 17, defeating fellow debutant Sandy Cajil via TKO in the second round at Cebu IT Park, Cebu City, Philippines.

On October 8, 2011, he defeated Shabani Madilu of Tanzania via unanimous decision in Pinoy Pride IX held in Bacolod, Philippines.

On March 24, 2012, during the Pinoy Pride XIII held in Cebu City, Pagara knocked out Thai visitor Phupha Por Nobnom in the second round.

During the Pinoy Pride 24 on March 1, 2014, Pagara knocked out former WBO Asia-Pacific champion Isack Junior of Indonesia in the very first round at Solaire Resort & Casino, Parañaque. On April 11, 2014, he stopped Indonesian fighter Skak Max via TKO in the third round held in his hometown of Maasin.

Pagara wasted no time by gaining his first-ever title, the IBF International Super Bantamweight belt against Hugo Partida. He demolished the Mexican via TKO in the first round at the Waterfront Hotel & Casino in Cebu City on June 21, 2014.

In his first international fight held at Dubai World Trade Centre, in Dubai, United Arab Emirates on August 7, 2015, Pagara knocked down his Mexican opponent, Jesús Ríos on the very first round, defending his IBF Inter-Continental Super Bantamweight title. The 21-year-old boxer caught Ríos with a strong straight right punch behind the ear that immediately knelt him on the floor. After his foe regained his consciousness, Pagara delivered numerous shots on Ríos' head and made referee Bruce McTavish stop the fight with more than a minute left on the first round while Ríos was literally still holding the ropes.

On July 10, 2016, Pagara sustained the first ever loss in his professional boxing career after his challenger Cesar Juárez of Mexico stopped him (knockout) in the 8th round, leading to Juárez's victory in the main event of Pinoy Pride 37 in San Mateo, California. After the fight, Pagara, with a neck brace attached was taken out of a stretcher and rushed to the Stanford Hospital in nearby Palo Alto. He was later cleared by the doctors after undergoing several tests.

Controversies
On September 1, 2021, Pagara was arrested in Cebu City for allegedly molesting and raping a 14-year-old girl. According to relatives of the alleged victim, the incident happened around 4:00 p.m. that same day in Pagara's house. Pagara did not resist arrest but denied the accusations. The following night, Pagara reportedly attempted suicide by self-strangulation in his jail cell but was saved by his fellow detainees. However, police denied that any suicide attempt occurred. He was released after posting ₱100,000 bail on September 8.

Professional boxing record

See also 
List of Filipino boxing world champions
List of IBF world champions
List of super-bantamweight boxing champions

References

External links 
 

1994 births
Living people
Lightweight boxers
People from Southern Leyte
Sportspeople from Cebu City
Boxers from Cebu
Filipino male boxers